Brinkmate is the situation in which an unavoidable checkmate sequence will be created by the player's next move. 

In shogi, brinkmate is known as hisshi (必至 "desperation, inevitability" or 必死 "sure kill"). Note that in shogi tsume is defined as strictly forced mate sequences with constant checks. The checkmating sequence itself (after the brinkmate) is known as a 詰め tsume.

Brinkmate differs from the situation in which a checkmate sequence is only being threatened to be created in the next move but is still avoidable if the opponent defends correctly. This situation is known as threatmate or, in Japanese, 詰めろ tsumero ("threatened mate"). Thus, brinkmate is an indefensible threatmate.

The only way to prevent a loss from a brinkmate is for the defender to not give their opponent a chance to actually create the checkmate sequence and instead initiate their own mating sequence (with constant checks) before their opponent's move. (Thus, a good exemplification of the saying the best defense is a good offense.) 

Some brinkmates involve tsumes that needs two condition to be met in order to defend (e.g. two mates are threatened). The defending side could give a check and simultaneously meet one condition (which is only possible in shogi games and brinkmate problems involving two kings), and then satisfy the other condition.

Although the terms brinkmate and threatmate were coined to translate the Japanese terms in shogi, the concepts can equally be applied to western chess and other chess-like games. (See: §Western chess below.)

In xiangqi, threatmate (催殺 "to expedite mating", often abbreviated as 殺) and brinkmate (絕殺 "absolute (indefensible) threatmate") are also common terms.

Shogi

Example 1

Figure 1 shows a classic hisshi (brinkmate) problem. Here, Black does not have a way to immediately checkmate White's king or to immediately create a tsume forced mating sequence. However, Black can create hisshi by moving and promoting their silver to the 74 square, that is 1. S-74+ (Fig. 2).

From this position, Black is threatening to drop their gold in hand to 83 in their next move to render an immediate mate. 

Even if White were to try to remove Black's promoted silver with ...Px74 (Fig. 3), this does nothing to prevent the simple mate in one with G*83 (Fig. 4).

White has two possible ways to attempt to defend against this threat. 

But, since this is hisshi and not merely tsumero (threatmate), all attempts are futile as explained below.
If White tries to defend the 83 square by dropping a defender (such as a gold) to 82 (Fig. 5), then Black can initiate a 3-move forced mating sequence starting from 2. G*83 (Fig. 6). 

Subsequent moves are 2...Gx83, 3. +Sx83 (tsumi).

If White's king tries to flee to the 82 square (Fig. 7), then Black can initiate a 3-move mating sequence starting from 2. +S-83 (Fig. 8). 

Subsequent moves are 2...K-71, 3. G*72 (tsumi).

Alternately, instead of 2. +S-83, Black could move P-83+ for another 3-move forced mating sequence, then 2...K-71, 3. G*72 (tsumi).

Example 2

Figure 9 displays a hisshi problem based on a real shogi game. Here, again Black doesn't have an immediate mating sequence, since 1. B-14 K-42, 2. G*41 K-52 and the king escapes. But Black can create hisshi by preventing the king from going that way by dropping their silver to the 52 square, that is 1. S*52 (Fig. 10).

Black has 8 threats: 2. S*41, 2, S*43, 2. G*43, 2. G*22, 2. S*21, 2. S*23, 2. G*23, and 2. B-14. There is no way to defend all of them with one piece, so White only has two good options to remove them. One way is to move the king to 42 (Fig. 11). But then, Black can drop his gold on the head of the king (2. G*43), and after 2...K-31, Black mates with 3. S-32 silver on the head mate.

And if White takes the silver by the gold or rook, then the White king's escaping route to 52 is blocked. Therefore, the mate sequence is 2. B-14 K-42, 3. G*41 K-43, 4. S*54 (tsumi). Without the silver sacrifice to 52, White could escape to 52 after 2. G*41.

Hisshi vs tsumero

The first adjacent diagram has an example of tsumero (threatmate) that is not hisshi (brinkmate). It is now White's turn to play. Although Black has a possible checkmate in their next move by dropping their gold to the 82 square, White can defend against this by dropping a gold to 71 defending the 82 square. With this move, White has removed the threat of Black's tsumero. If Black dropped their gold to 82 now, then White would simply capture it and attack Black's other gold (that is, 1...G*71 2.G*82 Gx82).

In the second diagram, there is an additional pawn positioned on the 73 square. This difference gives Black hisshi (as well as tsumero). Any defense attempt by White (fleeing or dropping a defending piece) will fail. White's 1...G*71 will be met with 2.G*72 Gx72 3.Px72+ (mate). There are similar mate sequences if White tries 1...R*32 1...G*82, etc. Similarly, it is impossible for White's king to escape with 1...K-71.

Silver on the belly tactic

Silver on the belly (腹銀 haragin "belly-silver") is a basic brinkmate tactic in shogi. This tactic positions a silver (by moving there or by dropping) directly on either side of the opponent's king. The adjacent diagram shows a typical silver on the belly brinkmate. Here the silver is placed on the 72 square. There are two threatmates, Sx83 (either promoted and unpromoted) and +B-71, and White cannot defend both. For instance, if White moves 1...R-87, then 2.+B-71 will mate, and if White moves 1...B*53, then the 2.Sx83 (either promoted and unpromoted) is mate.

Defending a two king brinkmate 

In example 1, there is no way to directly stop the mate, the 61, 62, 81 and 82 squares all needs to be protected, which could only be done by a dragon or horse. But white doesn't have a dragon or horse on the board, but he can make one by checking on the first move by dropping his bishop on 27. After Black moves his silver to block the check, the bishop can promote to 72 and defend. After this, if black goes 3. P-63+, white can drop his second bishop on 85, forking the king and the promoted pawn, and then take the promoted pawn (whether the black king in on 49 or 58).

Western chess 

Brinkmates (hisshi) and threatmates (tsumero) are also found in western chess.

See also

 Tsume shogi
 Checkmate

Notes

References

Bibliography

External links

 Shogi Shack:
 ABC of Hisshi
 Simple Hisshi · 1-move and 3-move hisshi problems
 HIDETCHI's YouTube video: How to play Shogi (将棋): Lesson #31: Threatmate and Brinkmate
 Shogi Planet: How To Lead To Fundamental Brinkmate (必至)

Shogi theory
Chess theory